Black Bart is a musical theater study by Juan María Solare, for one preferably long-haired female singer. Texts from Charles E. Bolton. (Buenos Aires, May 1993 and Köln, February 1995) [1'10"]. 4 pages. It is dedicated to Ligia Liberatori and was performed by her on 17 July 2001, in the Aula 2 of the University in Cologne.

Compositions by Juan María Solare